Trần Đình Đồng (born 20 May 1987) is a Vietnamese former professional footballer who played defender. He is best known for his time at Sông Lam Nghệ An and was part of the Vietnam national team. He was also infamously given a 28-match ban in March 2014 after breaking an opponent's leg.

References

External link

1987 births
Living people
People from Nghệ An province
Association football defenders
Vietnamese footballers
V.League 1 players
Song Lam Nghe An FC players
Thanh Hóa FC players
Vietnam international footballers
Footballers at the 2010 Asian Games
Asian Games competitors for Vietnam